Mnesarchaea paracosma is a species of primitive moths in the family Mnesarchaeidae. It is endemic to New Zealand and can be found in the Kaikōura, mid and south Canterbury, MacKenzie, Otago Lakes, Central Otago, Dunedin, Fiordland and Southland areas. M. paracosma lives in a wide variety of habitats including tussock grasslands, shrubland, and damp native beech or podocarp forests, at a range of altitudes from around sea-level up to 1200 m. Adults of this species are on the wing from October to February and are day flying, although they are attracted to light at night.

Taxonomy 

This species was first described by Edward Meyrick in 1885. The male lectotype specimen, collected by Meyrick at Lake Wakatipu on the 15 December 1882, is held at the Natural History Museum, London.

Description

Meyrick described the species as follows:

Hudson went on to give a more detailed description in his 1928 publication The butterflies and moths of New Zealand. He described the species as follows: 

This species is small and coloured ochreous-brown, with brown, white and yellow patches over its forewings. The antennae of M. paracosma are pale ochreous-yellow. The male of this species has unusually shaped genitalia that assists with the identification of this species.

Distribution 
This species is endemic to New Zealand and can be found in the Kaikōura, mid and south Canterbury, MacKenzie, Otago Lakes, Central Otago, Dunedin, Fiordland and Southland areas.

Habitat
M. paracosma lives in a wide variety of habitats including tussock grasslands, shrubland, and damp native beech or podocarp forests but are likely to be found near watercourses or moist  areas as a result of their larvae existing on periphyton. The species exists at a range of altitudes from around sea-level up to 1200 m.

Behaviour
Adults of this species are on the wing from October to February. Although this moth is normally day flying it is also attracted to light and has been collected via night light trapping.

Host species
The larvae of M. paracosma require moist periphyton and are believed to feed on a variety of fungi, algae, mosses, liverworts and fern sporangia.

References

Moths described in 1885
Endemic fauna of New Zealand
Moths of New Zealand
Mnesarchaeoidea
Taxa named by Edward Meyrick
Endemic moths of New Zealand